Bernard Lens may refer to one of three British artists:
Bernard Lens I (1630–1707), probably from the Netherlands, also the writer of several religious tracts
Bernard Lens II (1659–1725), son of the former, mezzotint engraver
Bernard Lens III (1682–1740), son of the former, portrait miniaturist

Lens
Lens, Bernard
Lens, Bernard